James Jerome Hill II (March 2, 1905 – November 21, 1972) was an American filmmaker and artist known for his award-winning documentary and experimental films.

Career
Hill was the child of railroad executive Louis W. Hill.

He was educated at Yale, where he drew covers, caricatures and cartoons for campus humor magazine The Yale Record.

His 1950 documentary Grandma Moses, written and narrated by Archibald MacLeish, was nominated for an Academy Award for Best Short Subject, Two-reel. He won the 1958 Academy Award for Best Documentary Feature for his film Albert Schweitzer.

In addition to making films, he was a painter and composer.

His last film, the autobiographical Film Portrait (1972), was added to the National Film Registry in 2003.

Philanthropy
Hill founded the Jerome Foundation, which gives grants to non-profit arts organizations and artists in Minnesota and New York City. Hill started it as the Avon Foundation in 1964, but after his death it was renamed the Jerome Foundation.
Among the projects the foundation funds is the American Composers Forum's Jerome Fund for New Music, which supports the creation of new works of music with grants to composers.

Hill also founded the Camargo Foundation in 1967, which administers an artists residency in Cassis, France.

Personal life
Hill was a stakeholder in Sugar Bowl Ski Resort. He had a chalet built at Sugar Bowl and, while living there, paid for and operated "The Magic Carpet", the first aerial tramway on the west coast.

Filmography (as director)

 1932 La cartomancienne
 1937 Ski Flight, featuring Otto Lang
 1950 Grandma Moses, written and narrated by Archibald MacLeish
 1950 Cassis
 1957 Albert Schweitzer, won Academy Award for Best Documentary Feature
 1961 The Sand Castle with Mabel Mercer
 1964 Open the Door and see all the People
 1965 Magic Umbrella
 1966 Death in the Forenoon
 1968 The Artist's Friend
 1969 Canaries
 1969 Merry Christmas
 1972 Film Portrait, added to the National Film Registry in 2003
 1991 Carl G. Jung or Lapis Philosophorum (material from an abandoned project, shot 1950, edited and published by Jonas Mekas)

References

External links
 The Jerome Hill Papers are available for research use at the Minnesota Historical Society.
 Selected Digitized Items of the Jerome Hill Papers are available for research use at the Minnesota Historical Society.
 
 Jerome Foundation
 Camargo Foundation
 Watch Grandma Moses at Folkstreams
 Dutiful Son: Louis W. Hill Sr. Book, Book about Louis W. Hill Sr., son and successor of empire builder James J. Hill, Father of Jerome Hill at Ramsey County Historical Society.

American film directors
1905 births
1972 deaths
Directors of Best Documentary Feature Academy Award winners
American experimental filmmakers
American documentary filmmakers